S.S.D. F.C. Trapani 1905, commonly referred to as Trapani, is an Italian football club based in Trapani, Sicily. It currently plays in Serie D, after a year long hiatus following its exclusion from Serie C during the course of the 2020–21 season.

They are nicknamed the Granata (the Maroons), after their kit colour.

History

In brief
During the club's history they have played mostly in the Serie C and D leagues. In the 2013–14 season, they played in Serie B for the first time in the club's history.

To date the highest league position the club has finished after the 1929–30 season was 2nd in the third highest level of Italian football, a position the club attained 3 times, in the Prima Divisione during the 1934–35 season, in the Serie C during the 1960–61 season and again during the 1962–63 season.

Before the 1929–30 season, the club played for one season at the then highest level football division in the 1921–22 season, but retired during the championship, forfeiting the last 6 matches.

In recent years, the highest league position the club attained was 4th in the third highest level of Italian football, then called Serie C1, during the 1994–95 season, a result that was bettered in the 2011–12 season when Trapani achieved a second place in the same division. Throughout their long history, Trapani have won at least six recorded league championships in various divisions.

Foundation
The club's roots can be traced back to 1905; on 2 April of that year, local newspaper the Gazzetta di Trapani ran an advert requesting young people to form a football association for Trapani. The club founded, by professor Ugolino Montagna and young native Abele Mazzarese to represent the West-Sicilian town was named Unione Sportiva Trapanese. It is one of the oldest teams on the island, after Palermo and Messina.

U.S. Trapanese's first president was Giuseppe Platamone and the club played their games at Via Spalti. The first official game for the club came against Palermo in October 1908, the more experienced Palermitan team won emphatically scoring 12 goals. The Trapanese bounced back, however, playing local derbys against teams from Marsala and Erice. In 1915 play was stopped because of World War I.

Post-war times
After the war, in 1921 three teams had risen up; Vigor, Bencivegna and Drepanum. During the 1921–22 season Vigor finished 6th in the Sicilian section of the national championship of the C.C.I. (Confederazione Calcistica Italiana). On 22 January 1923 a merger took place between Vigor and Drepanum, the club decided to revive the previous name U.S. Trapanese.

In June 1926, the name of the club was changed to A.S. Trapani. In the 1930–31 season, under the name Juventus Trapani, the club won promotion from III Divisione into II Divisione, the following season they achieved promotion again this time into the early 1930s equivalent of Serie C. They finished 8th in Serie C in the 1942–43 season, but then football in Italy was put on hold for the Second World War.

1940s, 50s and 60s
Just after World War II, the club were using the name A.S. Trapani for one season, before changing its name to A.S. Drepanum. They were entered into Serie C, which, at the time, was divided into many regional groups. For the 1947–48 season, they qualified for the new, smaller Serie C; even finishing above Messina. Unfortunately for the club, they were relegated down to Serie D, in the 1949–50 season after finishing second from bottom.

1990s: peak and decline
With former Serie A player Ignazio Arcoleo as head coach, Trapani experienced two consecutive promotions from Serie D to Serie C1 in the early 1990s.

In 1995, a strong and qualified team composed mostly of young promising players such as Marco Materazzi and more experienced local footballers such as Francesco Galeoto qualified to the promotion play-off, but ultimately lost to Walter Novellino's Gualdo in the semi-finals with a late goal scored on injury time. After that, Trapani experienced a slow but continuous decline, despite attempts to repeat past successes: Arcoleo left Trapani to coach Palermo along some of the best players, including Galeoto. The club then relegated to Serie C2 in 1997, Serie D in 2000 and even Eccellenza in the 2005–06 season, despite a late attempt by Arcoleo and former star Gaetano Vasari to save the team from relegation. In addition, the club also received a 12-points deduction for the 2006–07 season following a matchfixing attempt recognized by the Football Federation. In its 2006–07 Eccellenza campaign, Trapani, coached by former Parma midfielder Tarcisio Catanese, ended the regular season phase to eleventh place, and saved from relegation after having won relegation play-offs to Terrasini in a 5–0 single-legged win. From 2007 onwards Trapani competed in the Serie D with little success.

From Serie D to Serie B and league exclusion
In 2009, chairman Vittorio Morace appointed Roberto Boscaglia as new head coach, with the aim to bring the club back into professionalism; in his first season in charge, Trapani ended as runners-up behind Milazzo. However, later in August, due to the high number of resignations of clubs in the higher ranks, Trapani was admitted into the 2010–11 Lega Pro Seconda Divisione (formerly Serie C2), thus ending the club's 13-year absence from the professional ranks.

In 2010–11, Trapani finished as runners-up in the Lega Pro Seconda Divisione group C, and successively won the promotion play-offs to Lega Pro Prima Divisione. In the first campaign in the third tier, Trapani surprised everyone by topping the league against all odds; an end-of-season crisis, however, led to the Sicilians being overtaken by Spezia in the penultimate week of the season and losing direct promotion. In the subsequent promotion play-offs, Trapani defeated Cremonese in the semi-finals, but then lost a two-legged final to fourth-placed outsiders Lanciano. In the following season, however, Trapani were crowned champions (this time in group A) and finally promoted to Serie B for their first time ever.
In 2015–16, with Serse Cosmi as their coach, they finished in 3rd place, losing to Pescara in the play off final. However, they started off the following season badly, sacking Cosmi on 30 November with the club in last place. The appointment of Alessandro Calori saw an improvement in form, and the ended the season in 19th place, sitting in the relegation play off spots. Unfortunately, 18th placed Ternana finished five points above the Granata, meaning the club were relegated to Serie C for the 2017–18 season.

Trapani's first season back to the third tier, with Calori still in charge, saw the Granata ending in third place (behind U.S. Lecce and Catania) and then eliminated at the playoff stage by eventual winners Cosenza.

During the summer of 2018, Trapani's ownership announced their intention to sell the club and reduce the budget due to financial and legal issues surrounding the parent company Ustica Lines. Vincenzo Italiano was hired as new head coach in place of Calori, with Raffaele Rubino as director of football, for the new season. The season also saw the club being sold from the Morace family to the FM Service company, owned by Maurizio De Simone. The club ended the season in second place, and had a successful campaign in the subsequent promotion playoffs, making it to the finals against Piacenza after defeating Catania in the semi-finals.

On 5 June 2019, just a few days after the first leg of the playoff finals, the Trapani playing squad announced their intention to send their notice of default after the new ownership had repeatedly failed to pay their salaries. On 15 June 2019, Trapani defeated Piacenza 2–0 to win their second promotion to Serie B in the club's history. The very next day, Rome-based property developer Giorgio Heller (who was already linked to the club in the past) announced his acquisition of a majority 80% share of the club. The takeover was formally finalized on 21 June 2019, in time to allow the club to successfully register for the 2019–20 Serie B season. On 10 July 2019, Francesco Baldini was named the new coach of Trapani. On 5 October 2020, Trapani was excluded from Serie C.

Restart from Serie D
In the summer of 2021, Paceco-based Serie D club Dattilo acquired the footballing rights of Trapani, including the logo, and renamed themselves as Football Club Trapani 1905. In their debut season under the new denomination, Trapani ended in a mid-table finish.

Rivalries
Trapani's main rivals are Marsala 1912 and Mazara, respectively from the neighbouring cities of Marsala and Mazara del Vallo. A rivalry with Palermo also exists, but has rarely been contested: Palermo and Trapani briefly played together in Serie C1, and renewed their rivalry in the 2013–14 Serie B campaign.

Honours
Lega Pro Prima Divisione:
Champions: 2012–13

Serie C2:
Champions: 1993–94

Serie D:
Champions: 1971–72, 1984–85 	

II Divisione:
Champions: 1931–32

III Divisione:
Champions: 1930–31

Interregionale:
Champions: 1992–93

Notable former managers
 Heinrich Schönfeld (1930–33)
 Achille Piccini (1949–50)
 Ferenc Plemich (1953)
 Gastone Prendato (1955–57), (1961–62)
 Leandro Remondini (1962–63)
 Alberto Eliani (1972–73)
 Egizio Rubino (1977–79)
 Washington Cacciavillani (1981–83)
 Mario Facco (1989–90)
 Ignazio Arcoleo (1992–95)
 Ivo Iaconi (1996–97)
 Ezio Capuano (1999–00)
 Tarcisio Catanese (2006–08)
 Roberto Boscaglia (2009–15)
 Serse Cosmi (2015–16)
 Vincenzo Italiano (2018–19)
 Francesco Baldini (2019–2021)

Former players
Ivo Banella (1974-1978)

References

External links

 Official homepage

 
Football clubs in Italy
Trapani
Football clubs in Sicily
Association football clubs established in 1905
Serie C clubs
1905 establishments in Italy